Magruder Mountain may refer to:

Magruder Mountain (Idaho)
Magruder Mountain (Nevada)